Walnut Woods State Park is a state park of Iowa, US, located in suburban West Des Moines.  Within the Des Moines metropolitan area, the park preserves a bottomland hardwood forest featuring the largest natural stand of black walnut trees in North America.  The Raccoon River meanders through the  park, providing fishing and canoeing opportunities.  The park also provides picnic areas, a limestone lodge built in the 1930s, and a small campground with 22 sites.  More than 90 bird species have been seen in the park.

References

External links
 Walnut Woods State Park

State parks of Iowa
Protected areas of Polk County, Iowa
West Des Moines, Iowa